The highest-selling albums and mini-albums in Japan are ranked in the Oricon Weekly Chart, published by Oricon Style magazine. The data is compiled by Oricon based on each album's weekly physical sales. In 2010, 42 albums reached number-one.

Pop singer-songwriter Hideaki Tokunaga's Vocalist 4 had the longest chart run of 2010. The album remained at the top of the charts from its issue date of April 20 to May 24.

The best-selling album overall of 2010 was idol group Arashi's Boku no Miteiru Fūkei, released in mid-2010, which sold 1,053,064 copies. The second-best-selling album was Ikimono-gakari's Ikimonobakari: Members Best Selection, which sold 906.756 copies, followed by J-pop singer Kana Nishino's To Love, with 645,417 copies albums sold. The fourth- and fifth-best-selling albums were Funky Monkey Babys Best and Sense by Funky Monkey Babys and Mr. Children respectively. Funky Monkey Babys Best sold 613,603 copies, while Sense sold 597,212 copies.

Chart history

References

See also
2010 in music

Japan
2010
2010 in Japanese music